The Flying Dinosaur is a steel flying roller coaster at Universal Studios Japan. Designed by Swiss firm Bolliger & Mabillard, Flying Dinosaur restrains riders in the prone position. This attraction opened on March 18, 2016, and is currently the world's second longest flying roller coaster, as the track length has been surpassed by F.L.Y. in Phantasialand, which opened in September 17, 2020.

History
In June 2015, Universal Studios Japan confirmed that they would be adding a new Jurassic Park-themed attraction. Later in July, vertical construction began, when the park finished building the first supports and track. Later in August, the park released teasers around the park saying "The Greatest DINOSAUR RIDE IN THE WORLD! Coming in 2016...". Construction was going on for a while. Finally on October 2, 2015, the park officially announced that they were adding Flying Dinosaur.

Ride experience
The coaster starts in a dual station and leads into the lift hill. After it reaches the top, it drops 124 feet towards the ground and enters a zero-g roll, the first inversion, and then enters into a fly to lie element which makes riders face the sky. It then goes into a half pretzel loop and makes riders turn into a flying position again. Quickly, it turns into another pretzel loop, then enters a small tunnel at the bottom of the loop. It enters a small air-time element, then enters into the corkscrew. After the inversion, the train will enter a helix and comes to the final inversion, an inline twist which is just before the final brake run.

References

External links

 Official Attraction Page

Jurassic Park in amusement parks
Universal Studios Japan
2016 establishments in Japan
Flying roller coasters manufactured by Bolliger & Mabillard